Vasilios Vouyoukos was a Greek wrestler. He competed in the Greco-Roman lightweight event at the 1920 Summer Olympics.

References

External links
 

Year of birth missing
Year of death missing
Olympic wrestlers of Greece
Wrestlers at the 1920 Summer Olympics
Greek male sport wrestlers
Place of birth missing
20th-century Greek people